The 1972 24 Hours of Le Mans was a motor race staged at the Circuit de la Sarthe, Le Mans, France on 10 and 11 June 1972. It was the 40th running of the 24 Hours of Le Mans and the ninth race of the 1972 World Championship for Makes.

1972 marked the start of a new era with revised FIA regulations dictating the demise of the 5 Litre Group 5 Sports Car and the 3 Litre Group 6 Sports Prototpye categories and their replacement by a new 3 Litre Group 5 Sports Car class. There was also a significant change to the track with the construction of the new technical section subsequently named the Porsche Curves bypassing the dangerous Maison Blanche corner, which had been the site of many serious accidents in the past.

Having already won the World Championship for Makes, Ferrari chose not to contest the race. Matra-Simca were strong favourites for the outright win after not running the other races to focus on its Le Mans preparation. Once the challenge from Alfa Romeo and Lola had dissipated overnight, Matra were able to ease off to secure a popular 1–2 victory for the home country – France's first since 1950. Henri Pescarolo and Graham Hill were the winners, with a comfortable 11-lap margin over teammates François Cevert and Howden Ganley.

However the race was marred by the death of veteran Formula One racer Jo Bonnier who died when his Lola prototype collided with a Ferrari GT and flew over the barriers into the trees on the Sunday morning.

Regulations
Once again, the CSI (Commission Sportive Internationale - the FIA’s regulations body) overhauled its FIA Appendix J, redefining its motorsport categories. There was also no minimum production required. Not for the last time, the FIA’s idea was to encourage manufacturers to build, develop and use engines based around the current Formula One 3.0-litre standard.

Recognising the growing interest in touring car racing, the Automobile Club de l'Ouest (ACO) opened the entry list to Group 2 Special Touring Cars, alongside the Group 4 Special GTs and the new Group 5. Entries for the Group 2 and 4 categories had a 2-litre minimum but no upper limit on engine size.
They also revamped the minimum distance and speed requirements. No longer a set lap-time to qualify, all cars had to be within 140% of an average of the three best practice laps put up. Also the sliding scale of target distances was discarded. Now cars had to achieve at least 70% of its class winner to be classified. Therefore the Index of Performance, now redundant, was discontinued. Also, the Index of Thermal Efficiency now only applied to Group 2 and 4.

But the biggest change was to the track layout, with a new series of curves being built between Arnage and the Ford chicane bypassing the dangerously fast Maison Blanche section. Financed by Porsche, it therefore became known as the “Porsche curves”. The Ford chicane was also redesigned with a second chicane added just up the track to allow a dedicated pit-lane entrance lane to be built. This allowed cars to decelerate off the racing line and off the main track, greatly increasing safety. Although the modifications only added  to the overall track length, there was a noticeable change in lap times slowing the prototypes' average speeds by 30 km/h (18 mph). The circuit still had cars using full throttle for over 65% of the lap however.

Prize money this year included FF80000 (£6400) for outright victory, and half that to the respective winners of the GT category and Index of Thermal Efficiency.

Entries
With the new regulations there were 91 applications, and this led to a solid 66 arriving for practice and for the first time for a few years a full grid of 55 cars took the start.

In a major surprise, after winning every round in the Championship to date, and dominating the timing in the Test Weekend in March, Ferrari withdrew its works team less than a fortnight before the race. Having just secured the World Championship title, it claimed the engines on the Group 5 312 PB  were only good for the 1000 km races, and not 24 hours. This did not sound convincing however, since they had achieved a 1–2 victory at the 12 Hours of Sebring, but during a 24-hour simulation run the flat-12 engine in the Ferrari blew up during the 14th hour. Alfa Romeo had voiced the same concern about their engines’ durability but still showed up to Le Mans. John Wyer also chose not to bring his team's Gulf-Mirages because their Weslake V12 engines were not ready and under-prepared.

Although everyone had been outclassed by the Porsche 917s in 1971, Alfa Romeo had proven the most competitive, even getting three wins that season. For 1972 they had developed the latest iteration of the Tipo 33, the open-top T33/3. Designer Carlo Chiti used a tubular chassis rather than a full monocoque making them narrower and 50 kg lighter. The 3-litre V8 developed 445 bhp. The team picked up a number of ex-Porsche drivers for the three cars entered: Vic Elford/Helmut Marko, Rolf Stommelen/”Nanni” Galli and Nino Vaccarella/Andrea de Adamich.

Matra, like Jaguar in the 1950s, chose to concentrate its efforts for the prestige of a Le Mans victory. The latest version of the 660, the MS660C had been over a second slower than Ickx's Ferrari at the test weekend. But a new model, the MS670 was entered for the race. The 3-litre V12 was detuned for the race down to 450 bhp, pushing it to 310 kp/h (195 mph) on the Mulsanne Straight. With the French media stirring up a patriotic fervour, team director Gérard Ducarouge took no chances and bought 4 cars and 60 crew. Aerodynamic long-tail versions were prepared for Jean-Pierre Beltoise/Chris Amon and François Cevert/Howden Ganley while Henri Pescarolo/Graham Hill (back at Le Mans for the first time since 1966) had a short-tail version. The fourth car was the reliable 660C, given to Jean-Pierre Jabouille/ David Hobbs.

Porsche was now focussing its efforts on its 917 Can-Am project. However, Reinhold Joest got considerable inofficial factory assistance with his 908 LH entry, and sponsored by ATE. The three-year old car had been owned by Jo Siffert who had been killed less than a year ago, and was loaned from the Schlumpf Collection. It was refitted by Porsche with a new 3-litre engine capable of 360 bhp. Other customer teams brought Porsche Group 5 cars: the Spanish Escuderia Montjuich had a 908/03, André Wicky’s Swiss team had one of several 908/02s as well as an older 907.

Jo Bonnier, Lola’s European agent, convinced Eric Broadley to develop a 3-litre version of its successful T210. Designed by Patrick Head and John Barnard, the new T280 used the Cosworth DFV engine. It was very fast and had easily won the four-hour race at the Test Weekend. With works-support, Bonnier entered two cars: one for himself and 1971 winner Gijs van Lennep (released from Mirage for the race) and the other for Gérard Larrousse/Hughes de Fierlandt. Sponsored by Swiss cheese, they were this year’s art-cars painted up with gruyere cheese-holes. There were also a pair of privateer entries.

After a positive first run at Le Mans the previous year, Brit Alain de Cadenet decided to build his own car to race. He employed Brabham designer Gordon Murray to build a car around the Cosworth DFV (developing 390 bhp) and Brabham BT33 suspension.  The lightest of the 3-litre prototypes, De Cadenet got sponsorship from Duckhams Oil and the car was just ready in time for the race. Guy Ligier, keen to progress his JS-2 GT racecar, approached Citroën about getting a Maserati engine – whom they had bought out three years previously. They obliged and three 3-litre V6 JS-2s were present. Because insufficient numbers had been produced it had to run in the Group 5 category.

Ferrari had not released its Group 5 car to its customer teams yet, but had been able to homologate the 365 GTB/4 “Daytona” as a GT car, and nine of those cars were entered by the Ferrari agents of six different countries. These comprised Luigi Chinetti’s North American Racing Team (NART), Jacques Swaters’ Ecurie Francorchamps, Georges Filipinetti's Swiss team, Colonel Ronnie Hoare's Maranello Concessionaires from London and Charles Pozzi’s Paris-based team.

Chevrolet had five entries this year to take on the Ferrari challenge. The French teams of Henri Greder (once again with Marie-Claude Beaumont as his co-driver) and the Ecurie Léopard returned. American John Greenwood also brought a pair of specially lightened Corvettes that proved to be very fast, reaching 330 kp/h (210 mph) on the Mulsanne Straight. They ran on standard BF Goodrich radial road-tyres.  Their competitor, Goodyear tyres, had run successfully with the Florida-based English Racing Team winning the GT division at Daytona and Sebring. They asked NART if they could use an entry to get to Le Mans, who agreed as long as the car displayed the Ferrari motif on the side of the car.

A new manufacturer for Le Mans was the Italian De Tomaso company. The newly homologated Pantera had a Ford 5.3-litre V8, pushing out 330 bhp was less powerful than the Ferrari and Chevrolet competition. Four cars were entered and the Spanish Escuderia Montjuich ones had strong works support.

In the smaller GT-category, there were seven Porsche 911s from privateer teams. This year NART ran a Dino 246 on behalf of Ferrari to contest the 2.5-litre class. Once again, NART offered its junior car to winners of the Trofeo Chinetti - a competition for young drivers.

The European Touring Car Championship (ETCC) was proving popular with manufacturers and spectators. When the ACO opened the entry list to Group 2 cars, the Ford-Germany works team calculated that their pace in winning the Spa 24 Hours could get them into the top-10 overall at Le Mans. Three cars were prepared: the Capri RS2600 was refitted with a 2.9-litre V6 that could put out almost 300 bhp. Its drivers were all Le Mans debutants: current ETCC champion Dieter Glemser with Alex Soler-Roig, Jochen Mass/Hans-Joachim Stuck and Birrell/Bourgoignie. Their opposition in the ETCC was the Schnitzer Motorsport team running a BMW 2800 CS. Although BMW had recently head-hunted Jochen Neerpasch from Ford-Germany to set up BMW Motorsport, this was essentially a privateer effort for the company's first post-war entry. Despite the BMW's 3-litre engine putting out 340 bhp, the car was 250 kg heavier. The other entry was a British entry of an ex-rally Datsun 240Z.

Practice
Ferrari was fastest in the test weekend in March with a 3:40.4, but they were a no-show for race-week. On the damp first night of practice on Wednesday, it was Stommelen in the Alfa Romeo and Larrousse in the Bonnier-Lola who set the pace. The session was cut short though by a serious accident when an advertising hoarding blew onto the track. The Thompson/Heinz Corvette was damaged but the next lap the 2-litre GRAC sports-prototype crashed and burst into flames. Driver Lionel Noghès (grandson of Antony Noghès, founder of the Monaco GP), received serious burns to his face. 
Matra went all out on Thursday and salvaged French pride with a 1-2-3 qualification for Cevert (3:42.2), Pescarolo and Beltoise. Stommelen (3:47.9) and Bonnier were next then Elford's and Vaccarella's Alfas in sixth and seventh. The fourth Matra of Jabouille headed Larrousse with the Joest Porsche (4:03.3) and de Cadenet's Duckhams performing impressively for the cars’ age and youth respectively.

Fastest GT was Migault in his Ferrari in 20th (4:21.7), and the best Touring Car was the Capri of Mass/Stuck in 30th (4:25.9). As if to prove a point, the Capris were right among the Daytonas, faster than most of the Corvettes, Panteras and Porsche 911s. Three of the Panteras blew their engines, traced to a faulty batch of pistons from the US. Fastest in the small GT class was the Kremer 911 which did manage an identical time to the Capri (despite reserve driver Bolanos rolling the car in practice). Last on the grid were the young NART drivers in the Dino (4:53.9), getting in when several faster cars were withdrawn.

Race

Start
For the first time a French President was the honorary starter. In front of Georges Pompidou and a large partisan crowd, Matra started with all four of their French drivers. Pescarolo took the lead from Cevert on the first lap but things started going wrong straight away. On the second lap, Beltoise's engine expired on the front straight and then Bonnier cut through to take the lead on the third lap. During a short rain-shower, Bonnier's teammate de Fierlandt put in some quick laps to take the lead. But the Lolas’ smaller fuel-tanks meant they had to pit earlier, and more often, than the other prototypes. After that, it was the Alfa Romeos’ chance to take up the challenge as first Elford, then Stommelen moved up the order. In the GT class, Migault's French Ferrari had the lead until a jammed gearbox sidelined it, whereupon the sister car of Ballot-Léna/Andruet took over. Three of the Panteras had already retired due to the dodgy pistons – the remaining one of Claude Dubois being the only one that had not used a new American engine.

At 6.20pm, the Jabouille/Hobbs Matra 660 ran out of fuel within reach of the pits. Someone had accidentally flicked it across to the reserve tank, which dropped them down to 12th and 5 laps down. After four hours, the two Matra 670s were being pursued by Larrousse in the Lola. Stommelen had been delayed by a fuel-pump change but the Alfas still ran fourth, fifth and seventh split by Joest's Porsche. Weigel's 908/02 was eighth followed by the Duckhams and the charging Matra 660. The Pozzi Ferrari led GT in 12th and the Glemser/Soler-Roig Capri was 15th.

Another short shower wet the track and de Fierlandt put his car in the sandbank at the Mulsanne corner. He then burnt out an already weakened clutch trying to extricate himself. The Bonnier/van Lennep Lola had also been delayed by gear selection issues and when Bonnier had a tyre blowout at the Mulsanne kink at 320 kp/h (200 mph).

Night
As night fell and the track dried, Bonnier and van Lennep were putting in quick times to catch up and set the fastest lap of the race with a 3:46.9. At quarter-distance still had the two Matras swapping the lead (89 laps) with a comfortable 3-lap margin over the three Alfa Romeos. Sixth was Joest (84 laps) 
The Ferraris had a strong hold on GT as the Corvette engines failed; Pozzi leading NART (both 77 laps) while the three Capris were running like clockwork (76 laps).

But during the night first Vaccarella then Elford had clutch problems and each lost half an hour as new ones were fitted. So, by half time, at 4am, the Matras were running 1-2-3. The 670s still exchanging the lead at pit stops (178 laps) and the 660 recovering well, having just overtaken the Alfas (running Stommelen, Elford then Vaccarella - all 171 laps). Seventh was Joest's longtail Porsche (167) with the hard-charging Lola back up to eighth, 15 laps behind the leaders. With Weigel's Porsche ninth (161) and the Duckhams tenth (155 laps) the field was now very strung out. Things were still the same in GT – Pozzi and NART Ferraris on 154 laps, while Mass and Stuck (151) had stolen a 3-lap lead over the team cars in Group 2.

Morning
Right through the night the two leading Matras stayed on the same lap, exchanging places based on pit strategy. A misty dawn broke up the routine, as the Alfa Romeos fell away with their engine issues. The Lola lost over an hour with brake problems and Weigel's Porsche also had clutch problems. Although the BMW had retired with a broken engine there were also cracks in the Capri team too – Mass/Stuck stopped on the Mulsanne Straight with a broken conrod and Glemser's car needed a differential change.

In the early morning, Bonnier (after being again delayed) was running very fast and had got his Lola back up to eighth. Then at 8.25am, he came up to the Filipinetti Ferrari GTB4 of Florian Vetsch on the straight with 2 slight kinks in it between Mulsanne and Indianapolis, with thick forest on either side. The Ferrari kept its line and, deciding to force an overtake before the curve, his Lola hit the Ferrari at speed and flew 100 metres over the barriers into the trees. Fellow driver Vic Elford described Bonnier's Lola as "spinning to the air like a helicopter". Critically injured, Jo Bonnier died soon afterward. He was a veteran of 13 Le Mans and chairman of the Grand Prix Drivers' Association.
Vic Elford, coming upon Vetsch's car on fire, immediately stopped to rescue the driver who had already escaped with burned hands. By coincidence it was right beside a broadcasting television camera.  Shaken by the accident, Elford then pulled into the pits to be substituted by Marko, only for them to retire soon after when the replacement clutch packed up. Ninety minutes later the Alfa of Stommelen/Galli also retired with a broken differential, leaving the last Alfa Romeo running in fourth.

It started raining again at 10.30am. The Weigel 907 hit the barrier at the Dunlop Curve while running 7th. Cevert and Ganley lost time in the pits fixing wet electrics. Then just before noon, as the rain got heavier, Ganley was going slowly down the Mulsanne Straight when he was hit from behind by the Corvette of Marie-Claude Beaumont. He made it to the pits to get the rear-end repaired (taking nine minutes), but the Corvette was too badly damaged to continue. This allowed the Pescarolo/Hill car to build a secure lead over Cevert/Ganley and Jabouille/Hobbs, with the Joest Porsche well back in fourth. De Cadenet's Duckhams was doing very well in fifth until a slow brakepad change and bodywork repair dropped behind it the remaining Alfa Romeo.

Finish and post-race
The rain returned with two hours to go and created havoc. Cevert, de Adamich and Craft were on slick tyres and all aquaplaned off the track approaching the waterlogged Esses. The Duckhams had the heaviest damage and fell to 12th before getting back on the track for the final lap. As a final twist, the third-placed Jabouille/Hobbs Matra 660 was stopped by gearbox problems with less than 90 minutes remaining, and the Spanish Porsche running 8th was stopped by a wheel-bearing failure in the final minutes.

In the end, the Matra 670 of Pescarolo and Hill took the chequered flag with a comfortable margin of eleven laps over their teammates Cevert and Ganley. This was the first victory of a French car since the Rosier's Talbot-Lago victory in 1950. It also made Graham Hill the first and, to date, only driver to win the Triple Crown of the 24 Hours of Le Mans, the Indianapolis 500 and the Formula One World Championship. Although aware of the bad accident, Hill was only told of Bonnier's death after the race and was deeply affected. They were former teammates, close friends and had been the “senior statesmen” of the Formula One grid in the early 1970s.

Nine laps further back in third was the unheralded Porsche 908LH driven by Reinhold Joest, Mario Casoni and Michel Weber. It was then a close flurry for the minor places: The sole remaining Alfa Romeo, of Vaccarella and de Adamich finished just a lap ahead of the French Ferrari of Ballot-Léna/Andruet. Charles Pozzi's car was first GT home and also won the Index of Thermal Efficiency doing about 6.75 mpg. A late-race spin for the NART Ferrari cost it time to repair, finishing two laps further back. In a strong performance, five of the nine Ferraris finished, with Mike Parkes’ Filipinetti car just overhauling the Belgian car in the last hour. All the other GT manufacturers had bad races with a number of engine problems. Chevrolet, De Tomaso and Porsche only had a single finisher each. Three months after the race, Porsche unveiled its new 911 customer model: the 2.7-litre Carrera RS to even up the competition in Group 4.

The advent of the Group 2 Touring Cars was successful, with two of the Ford Capris finishing, in 10th and 11th. 
René Ligonnet's private entry Lola T290, coming home in 14th became the first Lola to finish at Le Mans.

Official results

Finishers
Results taken from Quentin Spurring's book, officially licensed by the ACO Class Winners are in Bold text.

'Note *: Not Classified because insufficient distance covered.

Did Not Finish

Did Not Start

Class Winners

Note: setting a new class distance record.

Index of Thermal Efficiency
For Group 2 and Group 4 cars.

Statistics
Taken from Quentin Spurring's book, officially licensed by the ACO
 Fastest Lap in practice –F.Cevert, #14 Matra-Simca MS670 – 3:42.2secs; 
 Fastest Lap – G. van Lennep, #8 Lola T280 – 3:46.9secs; 
 Winning Distance – 
 Winner's Average Speed – 
 Attendance –  ?

International Championship for Makes Standings
As calculated after Le Mans, Round 9 of 11

Note: Only the best 8 of 11 results counted to the final Championship points. The full total earned to date is given in brackets

Citations

References
 Armstrong, Douglas – English editor (1972)    Automobile Year #20 1972-73    Lausanne: Edita S.A.
 Clarke, R.M. - editor (1997)    Le Mans 'The Ford and Matra Years 1966-1974'    Cobham, Surrey: Brooklands Books  
 Clausager, Anders (1982)    Le Mans    London: Arthur Barker Ltd  
 Laban, Brian (2001)    Le Mans 24 Hours    London: Virgin Books   
 Moity, Christian (1974)    The Le Mans 24 Hour Race 1949-1973    Radnor, Pennsylvania: Chilton Book Co  
 Spurring, Quentin (2011)    Le Mans 1970-79    Yeovil, Somerset: Haynes Publishing

External links

 Racing Sports Cars – Le Mans 24 Hours 1972 entries, results, technical detail. Retrieved 13 Jun 2018
  Le Mans History – Le Mans History, hour-by-hour (incl. pictures, quotes, YouTube links). Retrieved 13 Jun 2018
  World Sports Racing Prototypes – results, reserve entries & chassis numbers. Retrieved 13 Jun 2018
  Team Dan – results & reserve entries, explaining driver listings. Retrieved 13 Jun 2018
  Unique Cars & Parts – results & reserve entries. Retrieved 13 Jun 2018
  Formula 2 – Le Mans results & reserve entries. Retrieved 13 Jun 2018
  Motorsport Memorial – details of the year's fatal accidents. Retrieved 13 Jun 2018
  YouTube – Colour footage of Matra's race (9mins).  Retrieved 25 Jun 2018
  YouTube – Colour footage of Porsche's race with German commentary (20mins).  Retrieved 25 Jun 2018
  YouTube – Colour amateur footage (no sound), in two parts (20mins).  Retrieved 25 Jun 2018
  YouTube – Vic Elford talks about Bonnier's fatal crash (2mins).  Retrieved 25 Jun 2018

24 Hours of Le Mans races
Le Mans
1972 in French motorsport